The 1967 Waterford Senior Hurling Championship was the 67th staging of the Waterford Senior Hurling Championship since its establishment by the Waterford County Board in 1897.

Ballygunner were the defending champions.

On 12 November 1967, Ballygunner won the championship after a 2-10 to 3-05 defeat of Ballyduff Lower-Portlaw in the final. This was their second championship title overall and their second title in succession.

References

Waterford Senior Hurling Championship
Waterford Senior Hurling Championship